Ikuti is an administrative ward in the Rungwe district of the Mbeya Region of Tanzania. In 2016 the Tanzania National Bureau of Statistics report there were 14,366 people in the ward.

Villages and hamlets 
The ward has 6 villages, and 29 hamlets.

 Lyenje
 Ijugwe
 Kezalia
 Kimomo
 Kitapwa
 Lyenje
 Mwantondo
 Ibungu
 Ibungu
 Kipya
 Makata
 Meega
 Ikuti
 Butonga
 Butumba
 Ibula
 Ikuti
 Kagisa
 Kinyika
 Lupupu
 Mabale
 Lumbe
 Lumbe
 Nsanga
 Kyobo
 Igembe
 Isuga
 Kitolo
 Kyobo chini
 Matale
 Ng'enge
 Kyobo Juu
 Kyobo Kati
 Kyobo juu
 Lubemba

References 

Wards of Mbeya Region